The Goodbye Look may refer to:

The Goodbye Look, a 1969 novel by Ross Macdonald in the Lew Archer series
"The Goodbye Look", a 1982 song by Donald Fagen from the album The Nightfly
"The Goodbye Look", a 1992 episode of the British TV series Perfect Scoundrels
"The Goodbye Look", a 2005 episode of the British TV series Murphy's Law
"The Goodbye Look", a 2011 episode of the American TV series Pretty Little Liars